Love Not Money is the second studio album by British band Everything but the Girl, which consisted of Tracey Thorn and Ben Watt. It was produced by Robin Millar, recorded at Powerplant Studios in London and was released in the UK on 15 April 1985 by Blanco y Negro Records. It spent nine weeks on the UK Albums Chart, peaking at number 10. In the United States, Sire Records issued the album with two additional tracks.

Love Not Money is EBTG's "most overtly politicised" album. Besides Thorn and Watt, notable performers on the album include June Miles-Kingston, Phil Moxham, Neil Scott and B.J. Cole. The tracks "When All's Well" and "Angel" were released as singles in the UK.  Love Not Money was reissued in 2012 as a remastered two-disc deluxe set by Edsel Records.

Themes
The band's Tracey Thorn told CMJ New Music Monthly her partner and bandmate Ben Watt had been buying guitars and wanted to make an electric-guitar-based album. Love Not Money songs cover subjects such as social stratification, sexism, and the sectarian conflict and terrorism in Northern Ireland. "Ugly Little Dreams" is dedicated to American actor Frances Farmer. Thorn said, "It's our most overtly politicised set of lyrics—some good, some a bit crass".

Chart performance
Love Not Money spent nine weeks on the UK Albums Chart. It debuted and peaked at number 10 on 27 April 1985 and slowly declined, falling to number 69 on 22 June, its final week on the chart.

Singles
In the UK, two tracks from Love Not Money were released as singles. "When All's Well" entered the UK Singles Chart on 23 March 1985 at number 88; it peaked at number 77 the following week, its last week on the chart. "Angel" charted on 8 June 1985 at number 97 and peaked at number 93 the following week then left the chart.

Critical reception

Reviewing the 2012 reissue, Jess Harvell of Pitchfork called Love Not Money "a near-total reinvention [of EBTG] and a complete stylistic mish-mash". She said its guitars are covered with "about nine pounds of agreeably dated glitz" and compared their sound with that of Icicle Works' music. Harvell also said, "it's the most soporific and studiously 'serious' album EBTG ever made, and parts of it are a real drag"; that the title track "Love Not Money" "plays the dreaminess of 80s soft-focus indie against the stark [political] reality that so much 80s pop was rushing to avoid"; and called "Sean" and its tin flute instrumentation "Celtic kitsch" that is "so ham-fisted you'll cringe".

Also reviewing the reissue, the BBC's Ian Wade compared the album with the music of Lloyd Cole and the Commotions and The Smiths, and wrote that "it sounded a desire for EBTG to be heard above the bigger crowds [EBTG] were beginning to play to".

In 2015, Emily Barker of NME rated Love Not Money in 16th place on her list of "50 Albums Released In 1985 That Still Sound Great Today", saying it "confirmed the duo as one of our nation's little treasures ..."

Track listing

2012 Edsel Records reissue

Personnel
Everything but the Girl
Tracey Thorn – vocals
Ben Watt – electric and acoustic guitars, piano, organ, vocals
Additional musicians

June Miles-Kingston – drums, backing vocals
Philip Moxham – bass
Neil Scott – electric guitar
Dick Pearce – trumpet
Nigel Nash – tenor saxophone
B.J. Cole – pedal steel
Dick Pearce – flugelhorn, trumpet
Peter King – alto saxophone
Chris Thompson – banjo
Dave Golding – tin whistle
Robin Millar – piano on "Angel"

Technical
Ben Rogan, Mike Pela – engineering
Caryn Gough – cover design
Humphrey Spender – cover photography, taken from Worktown People: Photographs from Northern England 1937–38
Richard Haughton and Jean-Louis Gregoire – inner bag photography
Thanked
Dave Haslam, Geoff Travis and Sid Parker.

Charts

Certifications

References

Everything but the Girl albums
1985 albums
Blanco y Negro Records albums
Jangle pop albums